Viridictyna is a genus of South Pacific cribellate araneomorph spiders in the family Dictynidae, and was first described by Raymond Robert Forster in 1970.

Species
 it contains five species, all found in New Zealand:
Viridictyna australis Forster, 1970 – New Zealand
Viridictyna kikkawai Forster, 1970 (type) – New Zealand
Viridictyna nelsonensis Forster, 1970 – New Zealand
Viridictyna parva Forster, 1970 – New Zealand
Viridictyna picata Forster, 1970 – New Zealand

References

Araneomorphae genera
Dictynidae
Spiders of New Zealand
Taxa named by Raymond Robert Forster